Democratic Movement – United Georgia is a political party in Georgia chaired by Nino Burjanadze; it was founded on 24 November 2008. The secretary-general of the party is Vakhtang Kolbaia.

Until 2012, the party was in opposition to the government led by Mikheil Saakashvili and his United National Movement. The party favoured closer ties with both Russia and the European Union while maintaining and expanding many of the government's economic and social reform initiatives. It also claimed to seek greater political freedom above and beyond what Saakashvili's administration claimed to provide. It vehemently opposed what it characterised as authoritarianism on the part of Saakashvili's government.

The government accused the opposition of plotting a coup in the wake of the 2008 South Ossetia war.  In turn, the party accused the government of conducting a "campaign of terror" against the opposition.

In 2014 some leaders of Christian-Democratic Movement joined and formed Bloc with Burjanadze's party and Georgian Troupe, bloc gained more than 10% on local elections, on Tbilisi Mayoral elections, 2014 party's candidate Dimitri Lortkipanidze came third.

Electoral performance

Parliamentary election

Presidential

Local election

2011 Georgian Protests

On May 21, 2011 over 10,000 people protested against Mikheil Saakashvili's Government, party leader Nino Burjanadze, her Husband Badri Bitsadze and other leaders of opposition were main figures.  Protests overgrew into violence and clash with Police on 26 May 2011 when protesters tried to prevent a parade commemorating Georgian Independence Day, some of leaders were arrested.

References

External links
Official website

2008 establishments in Georgia (country)
Conservative parties in Georgia (country)
Centre-right parties in Georgia (country)
Economic nationalism
Political parties established in 2008
Political parties in Georgia (country)